Restiform body or bodies can mean:

 Restiform body, the inferior cerebellar peduncle in the human brain
 Restiform Bodies (band), an alternative hip hop trio based in San Francisco, California
 Restiform Bodies (album), the second album and label debut by this band